Garry Goodrow (November 4, 1933 – July 22, 2014) was an American actor known for his role in the original stage production of the Obie Award-winning play The Connection (1959) and its 1961 film version, and as one of the original members of The Committee improvisational group. In The Connection, Goodrow played the young, intense, morose, would-be jazz musician Ernie, a heroin addict whose horn is more often than not at the pawn shop.

Career
The Malone, New York-born Goodrow was a member of the Living Theater and appeared in the stage and film productions of The Connection. He was a founding member of San Francisco's satirical improvisational group The Committee (improv group) and went on to over 50 screen appearances, including film roles in Bob & Carol & Ted & Alice (1969), Gold (1972), Steelyard Blues (1973), Linda Lovelace for President  (1975), Stay Hungry (1976), American Hot Wax (1978), Invasion of the Body Snatchers (1978), Escape from Alcatraz (1979), Cardiac Arrest (1980), The Hollywood Knights (1980), Breathless (1983), The Prey (1984), My Man Adam (1985), The Longshot (1986), Dirty Dancing (1987), and Circuitry Man (1990).

In 1973, he appeared in National Lampoon's Lemmings, which featured relative unknowns John Belushi and Chevy Chase. Goodrow, replacing Elliott Gould, joined the traveling anti-war agitprop performances of the F.T.A. Tour, in the early 1970s, featuring actors Jane Fonda, Larry Hankin, Donald Sutherland, Peter Boyle, Howard Hesseman, singers Holly Near, Barbara Dane, and many others.

Death
Goodrow died on July 22, 2014, aged 80, in Jersey City, N.J. He is survived by a son Jason, and a daughter Georgia.

Partial filmography

References

External links

Garry Goodrow at the Internet Off-Broadway Database
Garry Goodrow at Wolfgang's Vault (Bill Graham archives)
Tuli Kupferberg, Garry & Jason Goodrow: The Pointless Brothers

1933 births
2014 deaths
Male actors from New York (state)
American male film actors
American male stage actors
People from Malone, New York